Aaron Eugene Kofi Asante Ofori-Atta,  (12 December 1912 – July 1978) was a Ghanaian educator, lawyer and politician who served as the fourth Speaker of the Parliament of Ghana.

Early life and education
He was born on 12 December 1912 at Kyebi, Akyem Abuakwa and was a member of the Ofori-Atta royal family. After attending Presbyterian elementary school, he entered Mfantsipim School in 1925 and later left in 1928 to join Achimota College where he completed his secondary education in 1933. He served in various capacities at the Abuakwa State College and was made the school's Vice Principal and later Principal from 1944 to 1947. Later in 1947, he left for Ireland and entered Trinity College Dublin where he obtained his B.A degree in law and a diploma in public administration.

Career
Ofori-Atta was elected MP for Abuakwa Central and Begoro Constituencies. He first entered parliament house in 1954 and was appointed Minister for Communication from 1954 to 1956. He beat a relative, J. B. Danquah, member of the Ghana Congress Party and a founding member of the defunct United Gold Coast Convention to the Akim Abuakwa Central seat.
He was a Minister for Local Government in the Convention People's Party (CPP) government of Kwame Nkrumah in the first government of Ghana. He also served as the Minister for Justice in the same government.

He was later appointed Speaker of Parliament on 10 June 1965  in the First Republic of Ghana. He remained speaker until parliament was suspended by the National Liberation Council, formed after the coup d'état that ended the First Republic. Ofori-Atta is the uncle of Nana Akufo-Addo, President of Ghana.

Death
Ofori-Atta died at the 37 Military Hospital in July 1978 in Accra.

Notes

1912 births
1978 deaths
Akan people
Alumni of Achimota School
Mfantsipim School alumni
Ghanaian MPs 1954–1956
Ghanaian MPs 1956–1965
Ghanaian Presbyterians
Ghanaian Protestants
Local government ministers of Ghana
Speakers of the Parliament of Ghana
Convention People's Party (Ghana) politicians
Kofi
Alumni of Trinity College Dublin